Junkyard Jane is a Northwest "Swampabilly" blues band performing original music and consisting of: vocalist/percussionist Leanne Trevalyan, vocalist/guitarist Billy Stoops, bassist Barbra Blue, drummer Pete Marzano, and harmonicist/saxophonist Jim King.

The band coined the term "Swampabilly" as their defining genre when asked to describe their sound; a gumbo of Americana, blues, country, folk, funk, rock, and swampy, New Orleans influenced music written by songwriters Trevalyan and Stoops.

Former members include saxophonist Susan Orfield, trombonist Randy Oxford, bassist Alex Featherstone and drummers Chris Leighton, Darin Watkins, and Tom Sunderland.

History

Formation
Junkyard Jane's beginnings can be traced back to 1997, when the bands Cobalt Hook, The Generators, and a newly formed all-female group merged. When Stoops replaced the guitarist for the girl band, the three ensembles joined forces and became Junkyard Jane, with founding members being Leanne Trevalyan, Billy Stoops, Barbra Blue, Susan Orfield and Chris Leighton.

Discography 
Albums
 F-Bombs + Love Letters - 2011
 10 Year Reunion - 2008
 Rooster Hooch - 2004
 Leftovers - 2002 (limited release)
 Ductape & Sagebrush - 2002
 Swampabilly Snake Oil Freakshow - 2001
 Milkin' the Frog - 1999
Washboard Highway - 1998

Awards 
BEAM Grant Recipient(Benefiting Emerging Artists in Music)
"Best Band" - Washington Blues Society BB Award Winner
"Best NW Recording - Milkin' the Frog" - WBS BB Award Winner
"Best New Band" - Washington Blues Society BB Award Winner
"Finalist" - International Blues Challenge, Memphis (The Blues Foundation)
"Journey to Memphis 2000" Regional 1st Place Winner, Portland, OR
"Best Regional Act" - 3-Time Cascade Blues Association Muddy Award Nominee
"Best NW Recording - Milkin' the Frog" - CBA Muddy Award Nominee
"Best NW Recording - Washboard Highway" - WBS BB Award Nominee

Footnotes and citations

External links
Official website
[ Junkyard Jane] at Allmusic
Billy Stoops Interview NAMM Oral History Library (2021)
Leanne Trevalyan Interview NAMM Oral History Library (2021)

Musical groups from Tacoma, Washington